George William Albert Hendy, Hereditary Chief of the Miskito Nation was the grandson of H.M. George Frederic Augustus I, King of the Miskito Nation. He was elected by the Council of State to succeed after the death of his cousin William Henry Clarence on 23 May 1879. He died on 8 November 1888.

References

1888 deaths
Miskito people
Year of birth missing